Montserat Esquerdo (born 4 December 1960) is a Spanish fencer. She competed in the women's individual foil event at the 1992 Summer Olympics.

References

External links
 

1960 births
Living people
Spanish female foil fencers
Olympic fencers of Spain
Fencers at the 1992 Summer Olympics
Sportspeople from Barcelona